Kevin Klauber, ACE, is an American documentary film editor and writer. He is best known for his work on Pearl Jam Twenty, 20 Feet from Stardom, Chicken People, Diagnosis and Rita Moreno: Just a Girl Who Decided to Go for It.

Career
Kevin graduated from University of Southern California (USC) with a degree in film production. His editorial debut documentary feature, Pearl Jam Twenty.

Filmography

Awards and nominations

References

External links
 

Living people
American film editors
American Cinema Editors
American documentary film producers
Year of birth missing (living people)